Union Sportive Orléans Loiret Football (commonly referred to as US Orléans or simply Orléans) is a French association football club based in Orléans. The club was founded in 1976 and currently play in Championnat National after being relegated from the prematurely-ended 2019–20 Ligue 2. Orléans plays its home matches at the Stade de la Source located within the city.

History
The club was originally called Arago Sport Orléanais and founded as the football section of a general sports club in the city. In 1976, the club adopted its current name and turned professional in 1980. The club is based at the modern 5,000 capacity all-seated Stade de la Source. The club's record attendance was 11,680 against AS Monaco in 1989 and its colours are red and yellow.

Honours
Championnat National
Winners (1): 2013–14
Championnat de France amateur
Winners (1): 2009–10 (Group D)
Coupe de France
Runners-up (1): 1980

Players

Current squad

Reserve team

Notable players
Below are the notable former players who have represented Orléans in league and international competition since the club's foundation in 1976. To appear in the section below, a player must have played in at least 80 official matches for the club or have represented their respective national team during their stint at the club or after the player's departure.

 Marius Mbaiam
 Bruno Germain
 Jacky Lemée
 Cyril Théréau
 Jules Vandooren
 Robby Langers
 Laszlo Bölöni
 Milan Ćalasan
 Nicolas Pépé

Managers
 Jacques Lemée (1977–88)
 Jean-Pierre Destrumelle (1989–91)
 Henri Atamaniuk (1991–92)
 Jacques Lemée (1994–97)
 Bruno Steck (2004–06)
 Yann Lachuer (2009–12)
 Olivier Frapolli (2012–16)
 Didier Olle-Nicolle (2016–20)
 Cyril Carrière (2020)
 Claude Robin (2020–21)
 Xavier Collin (2021–)

References

 
Orléans
Orléans
Football clubs in France
Sport in Orléans
Football clubs in Centre-Val de Loire